Todd Clifford Rohloff (born January 16, 1974) is an American former professional ice hockey defenseman who played two seasons in the National Hockey League (NHL) with the Washington Capitals and the Columbus Blue Jackets between 2002 and 2004. The rest of his career, which lasted from 1998 to 2006, was spent in various minor leagues. He also played for the American national team at the 2002 World Championship.

College career 

Rohloff played junior hockey for the St. Paul Vulcans of the United States Hockey League before signing to play college hockey for Miami University in Oxford, Ohio. Rohloff established himself as a defensive fixture for Miami, helping the 1996–97 team to the 1997 NCAA Division I Men's Ice Hockey Tournament with a 27-11-3 record, with fellow defenseman Dan Boyle (First-Team All-American, 54 points) and center Randy Robitaille (First-Team All-American, 61 points). Miami lost to Cornell 4-2 in the regional quarterfinals played at Van Andel Arena in Grand Rapids, Michigan. Rohloff was voted the outstanding defensive player for Miami in 1996-97 and 1997–98, and captained the team in his senior year.

Professional career 

Undrafted out of college, Rohloff began his professional career with the Indianapolis Ice of the International Hockey League, advancing to the Portland Pirates of the American Hockey League (AHL) in 1998–99. Playing time with Portland would result in a promotion to the Washington Capitals with his NHL debut on January 9, 2002, with Rohloff posting an assist in a 6–3 victory over Columbus. He signed with Columbus for the 2003–04 season, seeing time with the NHL club while splitting time with the Syracuse Crunch of the AHL. He spent the next two seasons in the AHL with the Rochester Americans in 2004–05 and the Springfield Falcons in 2005–06.

Rohloff retired after the 2005–06 season.

Personal life 
Rohloff graduated from Miami with a degree in mass communications, and later worked for a construction and forestry equipment firm. He lived in Grand Rapids, Minnesota, with his family.

Career statistics

Regular season and playoffs

International

References

External links

1974 births
Living people
American men's ice hockey defensemen
Cleveland Lumberjacks players
Columbus Blue Jackets players
Ice hockey players from Minnesota
Indianapolis Ice players
Miami RedHawks men's ice hockey players
Portland Pirates players
Rochester Americans players
Springfield Indians players
Sportspeople from Grand Rapids, Minnesota
St. Paul Vulcans players
Syracuse Crunch players
Undrafted National Hockey League players
Washington Capitals players